Ciguatoxins are a class of toxic  polycyclic polyethers found in fish that cause ciguatera.

There are several different chemicals in this class. "CTX" is often used as an abbreviation.
  - Ciguatoxin 1
  - Ciguatoxin 2
  - Ciguatoxin 3
  - Ciguatoxin 4B (Gambiertoxin 4b)

Toxic effect on humans
Ciguatoxins do not harm the fish that carry them, but they are poisonous to humans. They cannot be smelled or tasted and cannot be destroyed by cooking. Rapid testing for this toxin in food is not standard.

Some ciguatoxins lower the threshold for opening excitatory voltage-gated sodium channels in the nervous system. Opening a sodium channel causes depolarization, which could sequentially cause paralysis, heart contraction, and changing the senses of heat and cold. Such poisoning from ciguatoxins is known as ciguatera.

Ciguatoxins are lipophillic, able to cross the blood brain barrier, and can cause both central and peripheral neurologic symptoms.

The major symptoms will develop within 1-3 hours of toxin ingestion: vomiting, diarrhea, numbness of extremities, mouth and lips, reversal of hot and cold sensation, muscle and joint aches. The symptoms may last from days to weeks or even months depending on each individual situation. There is no known antidote, though several therapeutic targets have been identified. The LD50 of ciguatoxin is 0.25 μg/kg.

Bioaccumulation
Ciguatoxin is produced by Gambierdiscus toxicus, a type of dinoflagellate. The phenomenon occurs in the Caribbean Sea, Hawaii, and coastal Central America. The toxin usually accumulates in the skin, head, viscera, and roe of big reef fish like grouper, wrasse, triggerfish, lionfish, and amberjack. It also affects barracuda, snapper, hogfish, king mackerel, and sea bass.

See also 
 Brevetoxin
 Domoic acid
 Okadaic acid
 Saxitoxin
 Tetrodotoxin

References

External links 
 

Ion channel toxins
Marine neurotoxins
Phycotoxins
Polyether toxins
Sodium channel openers
Spiro compounds
Non-protein ion channel toxins